Muhammad Suleman Shah Taunsvi or Khawaja Allah Buksh Taunsvi (1184 A.H / 1770 CE - 1267 A.H / 1850 CE), commonly known as Pir Pathan, was a Sufi scholar and leader within the Chishti order of Sufism. He was born to the Jafar Pakhtun tribe of Darug people, Loralai District, Balochistan province, in what is now Pakistan. His shrine lies in Tehsil Taunsa of district Dera Ghazi Khan of Punjab province in Pakistan. His urs (annual death anniversary) is celebrated at his shrine every year from (5-7) Safar al-Muzaffar, second month of the Islamic Calendar.

See also
Taunsa Sharif
Meher Ali Shah

Pashtun Sufi saints
Pashtun Sufis
People from Loralai District
19th-century Islamic religious leaders
1770 births
1850 deaths